High heels are a type of shoe.

High Heels may also refer to:

High Heels (1918 film), directed by P.J. Ramster
High Heels (1921 film), directed by Lee Kohlmar
High Heels (1991 film), directed by Pedro Almodóvar
High Heels (Brave Girls EP), 2016, or the title song
High Heels (CLC EP), 2016, or the title song
"High Heels" (JoJo song), 2016
"High Heels" (Melanie C song), 2019
"High Heeled Shoes" (song), 2017 song by Megan McKenna

See also
"High Heel Sneakers", a 1963 blues song by Tommy Tucker